Condello is an Italian surname. Notable people with the surname include:

Domenico Condello (born 1956), Italian criminal, member of the 'Ndrangheta criminal organisation
Mario Condello (1952–2006), Italian-Australian lawyer and criminal, member of the Carlton Crew and the 'Ndrangheta criminal organisations
Mike Condello (1946-1995), American musician, founder of rock band Condello
Pasquale Condello (born 1950), Italian criminal, member of the 'Ndrangheta criminal organisation
Tony Condello (born August 1942), Italian retired professional wrestler

See also
Castello (surname)
Costello (surname)

References

Italian-language surnames